"Bad Habits" is a song by American singer Usher. It was released as a single on September 10, 2020, via RCA Records. The song was written by Usher, Pierre Medor, Theron Thomas, and Keith Thomas, and samples Zapp's 1986 hit song "Computer Love". It was produced by Lxrd Rossi and Medor. A music video for the song, directed by Chris Robinson, was released simultaneously with the single.

Background and release
"Bad Habits" is Usher's fourth song release of 2020, following the singles "I Cry", "SexBeat", and "Don't Waste My Time" featuring Ella Mai. Both "Don't Waste My Time" and "Bad Habits" peaked at number one on the Billboard Adult R&B Songs chart.

Charts

References

2020 songs
2020 singles
Usher (musician) songs
RCA Records singles
Songs written by Usher (musician)
Songs written by Theron Thomas
Songs written by Pierre Medor